Mérey-sous-Montrond (literally Mérey under Montrond) is a former commune in the Doubs department in the Bourgogne-Franche-Comté region in eastern France. On 1 January 2022, it was merged into the new commune of Les Monts-Ronds.

Geography

Population

See also
 Montrond-le-Château
 Communes of the Doubs department

References

External links

 Mérey-sous-Montrond on the intercommunal web site of the department 

Former communes of Doubs